Angela Mary Littlewood (born 24 September 1949 in Nottingham, Nottinghamshire) is a female retired English shot putter.

Athletics career
Her personal best put was 17.53 metres, achieved in July 1980 in the Moscow 1980 Summer Olympics. This places her fifth on the British outdoor all-time list, behind Judy Oakes, Myrtle Augee, Meg Ritchie and Venissa Head. It was the British record at the time. She represented England in the shot put event, at the 1978 Commonwealth Games in Edmonton, Alberta, Canada. Four years later she represented England again in the shot put event, at the 1982 Commonwealth Games in Brisbane, Queensland, Australia.

International competitions

References

1949 births
Living people
Sportspeople from Nottingham
English female shot putters
Olympic athletes of Great Britain
Athletes (track and field) at the 1980 Summer Olympics
Commonwealth Games competitors for England
Athletes (track and field) at the 1978 Commonwealth Games
Athletes (track and field) at the 1982 Commonwealth Games